Richard Louis Holler (born October 16, 1934 in Indianapolis, Indiana) is an American songwriter, pianist, and performer, best known as the writer of the folk-pop standard "Abraham, Martin and John". The song has been recorded by numerous artists including Dion, Ray Charles, Bob Dylan, Kenny Rogers, Emmylou Harris, Andy Williams, Marvin Gaye, Whitney Houston, and Moms Mabley, among others.

Biography

Early life
He moved with his family to Baton Rouge, Louisiana in 1951, where he later graduated from University High School and attended Louisiana State University for five years. It was while attending LSU that he began to play piano and organize bands and writing songs with his college friends.

Career

Holler performed for two years on the local award-winning record rating TV teen show Hit or Miss along with movie critic Rex Reed and future actresses Donna Douglas and Elizabeth Ashley, During a January 1956 Teen Town Rally TV show he met musician brothers Ike, Tommy, and Jimmy Clanton. Holler was successful in signing the then under-aged guitar player & vocalist Jimmy Clanton to play with his band at that time, as well as Clanton's own neighborhood band, the Dixie Cats. In May 1956, the four-piece band of Holler on piano, Clanton on lead guitar, Mike Bankston on drums, and Ed Winston on tenor sax (with occasional bassist Leonard Root) was formed to play a four-night-a-week gig. A club owner later changed the band's name to Dick Holler and the Carousel Rockets, shortened to the Rockets.

The Rockets at times also included Mac "Dr. John" Rebennack, Grady Caldwell, Bobby Loveless (regional hit "Night Owl"), Jack Bunn, Junior Bergeron (Van Broussard band), Lenny Capello ("Cotton Candy", RIC Records), Bill Dunnam, Merlin Jones, Don Smith and Cyril Vetter (the writers of "Double Shot (Of My Baby's Love)", and others. Also sitting in at times was another Baton Rouge guitarist/vocalist/songwriter, Johnny Ramistella, later known as Johnny Rivers.

By 1957, the Rockets were recording at Cosimo Matassa’s Studio in New Orleans. Holler and Clanton each got recording deals on Johnny Vincent’s Ace label and the Rockets backed Clanton on his first release, "I Trusted You". Soon Jimmy Clanton embarked on a solo career, and Holler continued to front the Rockets until signed by Herald-Ember Records in 1961. Herald-Ember changed the band name to Dick Holler and the Holidays.

From August 1962 until May 1965 the Holidays based and performed in and around Columbia, South Carolina. Their 1963 third single release, "Double Shot (Of My Baby's Love)", later become a hit in 1966 by the Swingin' Medallions.

Holler later disbanded the Holidays, and, at the urging of producer Phil Gernhard, rewrote one of his Baton Rouge songs as "Snoopy vs. the Red Baron". Recorded by Ocala, Florida, band the Royal Guardsmen in 1966 for Laurie Records, the song became an instant hit, peaking at number two in the U.S. and number eight in the United Kingdom.

In 1968, Dion (DiMucci)’s recording of Holler's composition in tribute to the fallen Bobby Kennedy, "Abraham, Martin and John" reached the Billboard Top Five becoming a folk-pop standard known worldwide. This song was considered of such significance that it was the first of twenty songs discussed in Songs Sung Red, White, and Blue: The Stories Behind America’s Best-Loved Patriotic Songs, a book by Ace Collins.

"Abraham, Martin and John" also received the BMI Four Million Airplay award.

Later years

In October 2007, at a performance in Baton Rouge, Dick Holler was inducted into The Louisiana Music Hall of Fame. Holler  shares time between Switzerland and Georgia, USA. He has had several releases enter the European top 5 and top 10. Each year, Holler returns to Baton Rouge for a one night reunion with his old friends and musicians at the Baton Rouge Eagles' Club.

Discography 
Studio Album

 Someday Soon (1970)

Singles

 Living By The Gun / Uh Uh Baby (1957)
 King Kong / Girl Next Door (1961)
 Mooba-Grooba / Hey Little Fool (1962)
 Double Shot (Of My Baby's Love) / Yea-Boo (1963)
 Rock Of Gibraltar / (Sum Sum) Summertime Kisses 
 Shirley / I Want To Go Home (1964)
 Twist And Shout / He's Got The Whole World In His Hands (1965)

References

External links
 

Songwriters from Indiana
American rock pianists
American male pianists
Living people
Musicians from Indianapolis
1934 births
20th-century American pianists
21st-century American pianists
20th-century American male musicians
21st-century American male musicians
Musicians from Baton Rouge, Louisiana
Louisiana State University alumni
American male songwriters